Bad Luck Is All I Have is an album by American jazz saxophonist Eddie Harris recorded in 1974 and 1975 and released on the Atlantic label.

Reception

The Allmusic review stated "Eddie Harris had nearly as many voices as sax timbres -- ranging from nasal, sly asides to electronically strangled yowls and even falsetto. But none of these Eddie Harrises, nor the spirited percussive help of Willie Bobo, could save the humdrum, mostly R&B-based material that he created for this album".
Despite this, the album has avid fans.

Track listing
All compositions and lyrics by Eddie Harris, except where noted.
 "Get on Up and Dance" (lyrics: Lolita Harris, Yvonne Harris) - 3:30 
 "Bad Luck Is All I Have" - 8:40 
 "It Feels So Good" - 10:32 
 "Why Must We Part" (lyrics: Bradley Bobo) - 5:15 
 "Obnoxious" - 5:48 
 "Abstractions" - 10:24

Personnel
Eddie Harris - tenor saxophone, varitone, piano, electric piano, string synthesizer, vocals
Ronald Muldrow - guitar, guitorgan, electric guitar, vocals
Bradley Bobo - 6 string bass, vocals (tracks 1-4 & 6)
Calvin Barnes - percussion, gourd, congas, vocals (tracks 1-3, 5 & 6)
Willie Bobo - percussion, timpani, drums (tracks 1-4 & 6)
Rufus Reid - bass (track 5)
Derf - congas (track 5)
Oscar Brashear - trumpet (tracks 1-3 & 6)
Delbert Hill - baritone saxophone, English horn, tenor saxophone (tracks 1-3 & 6)
The Gerald Lee Singers: Stephana Loeb, Louise "Lovely" Anglin, Mary Haynes - vocals (track 2)

References 

Eddie Harris albums
1975 albums
Atlantic Records albums